ER degradation-enhancing alpha-mannosidase-like 1 is an enzyme that in humans is encoded by the EDEM1 gene.

References

Further reading